Flegel may refer to:

People
Erna Flegel, (1911-2006), German nurse
Eduard Robert Flegel, (1855-1886), German explorer
Georg Flegel (1566–1638), German painter
Murray Flegel (born 1948), ice hockey player
Willy A. Flegel (born 1960), professor of transfusion medicine and Immunohematology

Film
So ein Flegel